is a district located in Okinawa Prefecture, Japan.  The district covers all of the Yaeyama Islands except Ishigaki and the disputed Senkaku Islands.

As of 2003, the district has an estimated population of 5,579 and the density of 15.37 persons per km2. The total area is 362.89 kilometers2.

Towns and villages 
 Taketomi
 Yonaguni

Transportation
Two airports, Hateruma Airport on Hateruma island in Taketomi and Yonaguni Airport in Yonaguni serve the district.

External links
 Beach Guide for Yaeyama

Districts in Okinawa Prefecture